Richard Boyle D.D. was an Anglican bishop in the early seventeenth century.

He was appointed Dean of Limerick in 1661, and Treasurer in 1663. In 1666 he was appointed  Bishop of Ferns and Leighlin.

He died in 1682 and is buried at St Laserian's Cathedral, Old Leighlin.

References

17th-century Anglican bishops in Ireland
Deans of Limerick
Bishops of Ferns and Leighlin
1682 deaths